Numidia was an ancient Libyco-Punic kingdom located in the region of North Africa that today comprises northern Algeria and parts of Tunisia and Libya. The kingdom existed from the 3rd to the 1st century BC.  Rome established it as a client kingdom after the Second Punic War and annexed it, first in 46 BC and again in 25 BC after a brief period of restored independence under King Juba II (30 BC – 25 BC).

List of kings
All dates are BC.

Kings of the Massylii (Eastern Numidia) 
The last ruler of the Massylii conquered the Masaesyli and created the unified Numidian kingdom.
Zelalsen (Unknown, possibly shuphet)
Gala (died 207 BCE)
Ozalces (207–206 BCE)
Capussa (206–206 BCE)
Lacumazes (206–206 BCE)
Masinissa  (206–202? BCE)

Kings of the Masaesyli (Western Numidia) 
Syphax (bef. 215–202)
Vermina (202–???)
Archobarzane (???–???)

Kings of Numidia 

The three sons of Massinissa originally shared the kingdom, dividing responsibility. Micipsa later tried the same thing with his three heirs, but the result was a civil war. The Roman Republic defeated Numidia during the Jugurthine War. Gauda thus succeeded to a reduced Numidian kingdom. He divided the kingdom geographically between his two sons, establishing two different lines of Numidian kings. They were briefly displaced by a certain Hiarbas, but Roman intervention restored them.
Massinissa I (202–148)
Micipsa (148–118), son of Massinissa
Gulussa (148–145), son of Massinissa
Mastanabal (148–14?), son of Massinissa
Hiempsal I  (118–117), son of Micipsa
Adherbal (118–112), son of Micipsa
Jugurtha  (118–105), son of Mastanabal
Gauda  (105–88), son of Mastanabal
Hiarbas (??–81)

Eastern Numidia
This was the main Numidian kingdom after 81.
Hiempsal II (88–60), son of Gauda
Juba I (60–46), son of Hiempsal II
Annexed to Rome as province Africa Nova (46–30).
Juba II (30–25), son of Juba I
Annexed to Rome as province Africa Proconsularis (25 BCE - 193 CE).

Western Numidia
This was a much smaller chiefdom than Eastern Numidia

Masteabar (88–81)
Massinissa II (81–46)
Sittius (46–44), a Roman mercenary leader
Arabio (44–40)
Annexed to Rome as part of province Africa Nova (40–30).
Juba II (30–25), son of Juba I
Annexed to the Kingdom of Mauretania (25 BCE - 40 CE).

References

 
Lists of African monarchs
3rd-century BC establishments
1st-century BC disestablishments
Lists of Berber people